The Mannlicher M1893 (or M93) is a bolt-action rifle that was the standard service rifle of the Kingdom of Romania from 1893 to 1938. The rifle and its 1892 predecessor were the first repeating rifles to be widely issued in the Romanian military. It was later replaced by the Czechoslovak-designed Vz. 24 as the standard service rifle.

Development

Around the year 1890 the Romanian military started its search for a small bore, smokeless powder firearm to replace the breech-loading single-shot Martini–Henry M1879. They turned to the nearby Österreichische Waffenfabriksgesellschaft (ŒWG) in Steyr, Austria-Hungary where then-factory manager Otto Schönauer was modifying the German Gewehr 1888 rifle, the license on which ŒWG got as a compensation for patent infringement by the Komissiongewehr's designers on Ferdinand Mannlicher's en-bloc clip feeding system. After Mannlicher and Schönauer removed all the obvious defects of the G88 caused by its hasty design (mainly fixed the double feeding problem by modifying bolt head geometry) and adapted the German modernization of the clip allowing the latter to be fed into the rifle regardless of whether the clip was turned up or down for a rimmed round, the Model 1892 rifle was ready for testing by the Romanian Army. A number of 8,000 rifles was ordered between 1891 and 1892. After some minor improvements, the final variant, the M1893, chambered for the 6.5x53R round also called the "6.5x53.5mmR Romanian", was put into production. Compared to the M1892 model, the M1893 had an additional stacking rod, reinforcing ribs on the lower part of the magazine housing, and a safety feature was added to the bolt so it could not be re-inserted if assembled improperly. Unlike the Austrian-issue Mannlicher M1895 straight-pull bolt-action rifle, the Romanian rifle had a conventional turn-bolt.

The rifle's adoption caused some controversy, as despite the weapon's approval by King Carol I, General Constantin Budișteanu derided the Austrian rifle as un baton ("a stick") that required improvements. The rifle's bore, smaller than the usual Mannlicher product, also caused difficulties in finding compatible gunpowder.

It was used by cavalry and artillery units. Unlike the rifles, the carbines could not mount bayonets. This forced the cavalry units fighting on foot to use their lances in melee combat during the 1916 campaign. A bayonet was eventually added to 20,000 carbines after an invention by cavalry Captain Botez.

History
Deliveries started in 1893, and by 1907 more than 100,000 rifles were in service. After the end of the Second Balkan War, Romania ordered 200,000 more rifles, however, only about 100,000 of these were delivered due to the start of the First World War. Rifles which were not delivered entered service with the Austro-Hungarian Army. The assembled rifles in the original caliber were designated as "6.5mm M.93 Rumänisches Repetier Gewehr". Unassembled rifles were modified to accommodate the 8×50mmR Mannlicher cartridge and issued to Austrian Landwehr units. When Romania entered the war in 1916, around 373,000 rifles and 60,000 carbines were in service with the Romanian Army. These were distributed to the infantry and Vânători regiments, while carbines were issued to cavalry, cyclists and Vânători units. Many rifles were destroyed or captured during the Romanian campaign. At the end of the war, only 82,000 rifles were still in service with Romania.

Following the war, 8mm M93 rifles were given as war reparations to Czechoslovakia and Yugoslavia. The Yugoslav rifles, designated as "Puška 8mm M93", were captured by the Germans in World War II. The Germans referred to these rifles as "8mm Puschka M93/30 Rumänisches". The Romanian Mannlicher also saw some service in the Spanish Civil War by Spanish Republicans and captured by the Nationalists. It is unknown how these rifles were obtained.

Portuguese Mannlicher M1896
The Kingdom of Portugal bought about 12,500 6.5mm Mannlicher rifles and carbines from Steyr, some in 1896, for the Navy and Cavalry, and the remainder in 1898 for the Artillery. These rifles carry the "CI" monogram of Carlos I of Portugal. The 6.5x53R cartridges were first imported from Georg Roth and later made in Portugal.

In 1946 a few hundred of the Portuguese Mannlichers were adapted to fire the 5.6mm calibre (.22 Rimfire), for training.

Ammunition

6.5×53mmR:  
The 6.5×53mmR ammunition for the Romanian rifles was provided at first by Georg Roth, and Keller & Co. Local production was also carried out at Pirotehnica Armatei, with a production rate of 200,000 cartridges per day registered in 1914. Later, ammunition was also purchased from DWM, Manfréd Weiss and Hirtenberger Patronen. During the First World War, factories from France, Italy, the United Kingdom, and the United States also provided ammunition.

World War 2-era 6.5×53mmR caliber surplus and earlier ammunition is still available, but these are primarily corrosive in nature and rifles will require a thorough cleaning to reduce the development of rust.  Due to very close dimensional relationships, boxer-primed cartridge cases can be made by resizing and trimming .303 British or .30-40 Krag (.30-40 US) brass, and Fire forming the resulting altered brass cases in the 6.5x53R chamber. Alteration of the original chamber by re-chambering with a 6.5x57R chamber reamer has also been done, but the overall length of the original 6.5x53mmR Romanian cartridge has to be maintained by seating the projectile more deeply in order to fit the original magazine.  It would also be a best practice to retain the upper C.I.P. 6.5x57mmR pressure limit of 3300 Bar to reduce additional stress on these 80 to 125 year old rifles.

8×50mmR Mannlicher:
8×50mmR Mannlicher reloadable cartridge cases can be produced by reforming and trimming 8×56mmR Mannlicher or 7.62×54mmR Mosin–Nagant Russian brass. Standard .323" 8mm S-bullets are correct for this caliber though best results are obtained from open-base bullets that can expand to fit the .329" bore. RCBS offers both reforming and reloading dies. Rifles such as the Mannlicher M.95 using a stronger rotating-bolt design can be loaded to higher pressures.

Users

 - used by the Spanish Republican faction

See also
Geweer M. 95 - Dutch Mannlicher variant, similar to the M1893
Table of handgun and rifle cartridges
6.5×53mmR
8×50mmR Mannlicher
6.5×57mm Mauser

References

Bibliography

8×50mmR Mannlicher firearms
Bolt-action rifles
Rifles of Austria
Rifles of Romania
World War I Austro-Hungarian infantry weapons
Mannlicher rifles
Weapons and ammunition introduced in 1893
1893 in Romania
Romania in World War I